The Department of Natural Resources and Energy Development is the department in the Government of New Brunswick, Canada, that oversees matters related to natural resources and energy development.

It is responsible for management of the Province's forests including timber utilization; trail management; insect and disease protection including spruce budworm and gypsy moth; fire protection; management of the fish and wildlife resources and the issuing of hunting and angling licenses; management of mineral and hydrocarbon resources and associated support services including oil and natural gas development and production; geological surveys; management of Crown lands, including natural areas; oversight and development of the energy sector; and overseeing the delivery of the First Nations wood harvesting program.

History 
The department, or a minister responsible for this area, has existed in one form or another since 1793. The Cabinet Minister responsible for the department was originally known as the Surveyor-General and later as Minister of Lands and Mines,  Minister of Natural Resources, and also Minister of Natural Resources and Energy.

In 2016 cabinet shuffle by then premier Brian Gallant, the department changed its name from the Department of Natural Resources to the Department of Energy and Resource Development. 

After the election of premier Blaine Higgs in the 2018 New Brunswick general election, the department was further renamed to the Department of Natural Resources and Energy Development.

Ministers

References
 Governmenmt of New Brunswick – Department of Natural Resources
 Government of New Brunswick, list of Department Ministers 1944–2006 (PDF file)
 Governmenmt of New Brunswick – Legislative Assembly of New Brunswick MLA Bios - 58th Legislature
 Government of New Brunswick, News Release June 6, 2016

Energy and Resource Development
Environmental organizations based in New Brunswick
New Brunswick